William Addington may refer to:

 William Addington, 3rd Viscount Sidmouth (1824–1913)
 William Addington (judge), see Margaret Nicholson
William Leonard Addington, 2nd Viscount Sidmouth (1794–1864)

See also
Addington (surname)